Twin Elm Rugby Park is a sports venue in South Nepean, Ottawa, Ontario, Canada. With five rugby fields and 12 changing rooms, two lounges, a bar and spectator seating for hundreds of people it can accommodate several concurrent matches and serves as the home of several local clubs. The facility is fully air conditioned with kitchen facilities. The Eastern Ontario Selects play their home games at the venue, and also hosts a number of national and international games.
In addition to rugby, the park is also home to other sports such as soccer, lacrosse, ultimate Frisbee and volleyball.

External links
 Twin Elm Rugby Park The official Twin Elm Rugby Park web site

Sports venues in Ottawa
Rugby union stadiums in Ontario
Rugby union in Ontario